Emilian Bucov or Bukov (in Kiliya, Odessa Oblast, Ukraine – 17 October 1984) was a Soviet and Moldavian writer and poet, recognized with the State Prize of the Moldavian SSR and honorary title of People's Writer of the Moldavian SSR (1982). He studied at the Bucharest University and took part in underground communist movement. Bukov was awarded the Hero of Socialist Labour in 1979 for his work, the Order of Lenin medal twice and the Order of the Red Banner of Labour, twice.

Biography

Professional and political activity
He was born in a poor Lipovan and Moldovan family, he graduated from, after overcoming material difficulties, the "B.P. Hașdeu" lyceum in Chișinău (1930) and then, the Faculty of Letters and Philosophy of the University of Bucharest (1936). As a student, he became a member of the Union of Communist Youth and unlawfully carries out various political activities.

From 1940 he fled to Moscow and contributes through his lyrics to the dissemination of anti-Romanian Bolshevik slogans. Established in 1944 in Chișinău, he was considered one of the leading activist writers in Moldavian SSR. He was the chairperson of the Writers' Union (1945-1946, 1955-1958), deputy chairperson of the Soviet Ministries of the MSR (1947-1951), editor-in-chief of the Nistru magazine (1966-1971). He was awarded the State Prize of Moldova (1966), entitled Hero of Socialist Labour (1979) and The People's Writer (1982).

Writings

Bucov collaborated with the left wing or avant-garde magazines; his first writing was a translation from Russian language, published in 1933 in Herald. He then continues to publish lyrics and prose at the Literary and Artistic Truth (Adevărul literar și artistic), the Free Word (Cuvîntul Liber), the Torch (Făclia) and the Society of Tomorrow (Societatea de Mâine), signing either Bâcov or Bucov. He published in the Free Word weekly a "moderate left article"; the weekly under the leadership of Tudor Teodorescu-Braniște was published 1933 by the end of 1936 and where he signed his articles as Radu Bîcov-Emilian in which deplored the situation of the exploited workers or calling them for strikes. His lyric looks like was produced by a vocal rioter, which announces the "Parnassus sunset," and rejects the bourgeois poetry (including the Eminescu), cultivating and promoting the firebrand proletarian thematics. The model was the Soviet poetry of that time, especially the one of Vladimir Mayakovsky, which he translated and whom made popular. 

He gathered his lyrics from the Romanian period in the “Speech of the Sun” (Discursul Soarelui) volumes (1937) and China (1938). The Soviet period began in 1942 in Moscow, where the volumes containing violent anti-Romanian lyrics appeared. It is the guideline that has been preserved for four decades, the time when he published a lot. An industrial polygraph, Bucov presents the clichés of Soviet propaganda in poemes, in novels, in dramaturgy, guided by the principle - which he has also rhyme - "Moscow is my sun and Kyiv is my brother". Around his life and writings, Soviet officials have created a fruitful legend. He also made the translation of I.Ilf, E. Petrov and Sergei Yesenin.

References

1909 births
1984 deaths
20th-century male writers
People from Kiliya
People from Izmailsky Uyezd
Communist Party of the Soviet Union members
University of Bucharest alumni
Second convocation members of the Supreme Soviet of the Soviet Union
Third convocation members of the Supreme Soviet of the Soviet Union
Heroes of Socialist Labour
Recipients of the Order of Lenin
Recipients of the Order of the Red Banner of Labour
Anti-Romanian sentiment
National anthem writers
Socialist realism writers
Moldovan male writers
Soviet male writers
20th-century Ukrainian writers